Antonino "Nino" Giuffrè (born 21 July 1945) is an Italian mafioso from Caccamo in the Province of Palermo, Sicily. He became one of the most important Mafia turncoats after his arrest in April 2002.

Other sources claim he lost his hand in a hunting accident. Giuffrè was trained as an agricultural sciences specialist. His rise in the Mafia ran parallel to the ascension of the Corleonesi clan headed by Salvatore Riina. He became the head of the mandamento of Caccamo.

Mafia and Forza Italia
According to Giuffrè the Mafia turned to Berlusconi's Forza Italia party to look after the Mafia's interests, after the decline in the early 1990s of the ruling Christian Democracy party (DC - Democrazia Cristiana) — whose leaders in Sicily looked after the Mafia's interests in Rome. The Mafia's fall out with the Christian Democracy became clear when the DC strong man in Sicily, Salvo Lima, was killed in March, 1992. "The Lima murder marked the end of an era", Giuffrè told the court. "A new era opened with a new political force on the horizon which provided the guarantees that the Christian Democracy were no longer able to deliver. To be clear, that party was Forza Italia."

According to Giuffrè, Marcello Dell'Utri — Berlusconi's right-hand man and the man who invented Forza Italia — was the go-between on a range of legislative efforts to ease pressure on mobsters in exchange for electoral support. Giuffrè said that Bernardo Provenzano told him that they "were in good hands" with Dell'Utri, who was a "serious and trustworthy person" and was close to Berlusconi. "Dell'Utri was very close to Cosa Nostra and a very good contact point for Berlusconi", Giuffrè said. Provenzano said that the Mafia's judicial problems would be resolved within 10 years after 1992, thanks to the undertakings given by Forza Italia.

Giuffrè said that Silvio Berlusconi himself used to be in touch with Stefano Bontade, a top Mafia boss, in the mid-1970s. At the time Berlusconi still was just a wealthy real estate developer and started his private television empire (Berlusconi became prime minister in 1994 and again from 2001 to 2006). Bontade visited Berlusconi's villa in Arcore. Bontade's contact at Berlusconi's villa was the late Vittorio Mangano, a convicted mafioso who has been alleged to work there as a stableman. Giuffrè declared that other Mafia representatives who were in contact with Berlusconi included the Palermo bosses Filippo Graviano and Giuseppe Graviano — arrested in 1994 and jailed for life ordering the murder of anti-mafia priest Pino Puglisi in their territory Brancaccio.

The alleged pact with the Mafia fell apart in 2002. Cosa Nostra had achieved nothing. There were no revisions of Mafia trials, no changes in the law of asset seizures and no changes in the harsh prison laws (41 bis).

Pentito
Antonino Giuffrè was arrested on 16 April 2002. He started feeding investigators information even before he agreed to turn state' witness (or pentito) in June 2002. He is one of the most important Mafia turncoats since Tommaso Buscetta in 1984. His collaboration has updated investigators' knowledge and provided a new interpretation for the sensitive issue of Cosa Nostra's relations with politics in the early 1990s. "It's very simple: we are the fish and politics is the water", Giuffrè said.

Giuffrè has an encyclopedic knowledge of Cosa Nostra's affairs over the past two decades, partly from having played host to Michele Greco "the Pope" in the 1980s, when the supreme mafia boss was on the run and took refuge near Caccamo, Giuffrè's home town. Subsequently he became one of the right-hand man of Bernardo Provenzano who became the Mafia's reference point when Salvatore Riina was arrested in January 1993.

Giuffrè became part of the "directorate" that was established by Bernardo Provenzano, according to Antonio Ingroia, a leading anti-Mafia magistrate in Sicily. This group "of about four to seven people" met very infrequently, only when necessary, when there were strategic decisions to make. Among the other members of the directorate were Salvatore Lo Piccolo from Palermo; Benedetto Spera from Belmonte Mezzagno; Salvatore Rinella from Trabia; Giuseppe Balsano from Monreale; Matteo Messina Denaro from Castelvetrano; Vincenzo Virga from Trapani; and Andrea Manciaracina from Mazara del Vallo.

Andreotti and Calvi
Antonio Giuffrè has been a state witness in many important trials. He told an Italian court that former prime minister Giulio Andreotti was a key Mafia contact during his long political career. Giuffrè said Mafia bosses had asked Andreotti to shield them from magistrates.

Giuffrè is also giving testimony in the Roberto Calvi murder trial. He claims that Mafia bosses had been angry at the way Calvi had mishandled their money and ordered the hit. He named Giuseppe Calò as the man who organised the crime. "Within Cosa Nostra, we had some big laughs when we read in the newspapers that Calvi had committed suicide", Giuffrè said. "Cosa Nostra's problems get resolved in only one way: by elimination."

According to Giuffrè, the Mafia plotted to kill Giuseppe Lumia while he was the president of the Parliamentary Antimafia Commission (2000–2001). The plan to kill Lumia was decided at the very highest level of Cosa Nostra and had been approved by Provenzano. It was not carried out, however.

References

External links

1945 births
Living people
Fugitives
Gangsters from the Province of Palermo
Pentiti
People from Caccamo
Sicilian Mafia Commission